Adam Hartle was an American stand up comedian.

Comedy career
Hartle first made national headlines in 2012 during filming of his comedy documentary Mile High: The Comeback of Cannabis where he and director Anthony Hashem purchased the first joints legally sold in US history (2nd official purchase). The film enjoyed much critical acclaim including a notable scene, during an interview with former Congressman and Presidential candidate Tom Tancredo where Hartle bet the Congressman that if the marijuana vote passed in Colorado, the two would smoke a legal joint together. In 2014, Hartle and the film's director Anthony Hashem debuted their film at the historic Mayan Theater in Denver, CO. The world premiere garnered much media attention both nationally and internationally as the comedian handed out free cannabis legally to all those in attendance, a first in movie viewing history, to all those over 21 per the new law documented in the film.

Hartle performed at some of the best comedy clubs in the world including the Icehouse in Pasadena and the Comedy Store in Hollywood.

Early life
Adam Hartle grew up in Jacksonville, FL. He is half Iraqi on his Mother's side. He attended college at the University of Florida where he worked for the Florida Gator football team as a student assistant in the video department for then head Coach Steve Spurrier. His duties included filming practices and games for the coaching staff. By the time Hartle was a Senior, he'd gotten to know the staff so well he was able to sit in on strategic team meetings. Upon graduating, with a letter of recommendation from Coach Spurrier, Hartle began coaching high school football despite having never played. At the age of 22, Hartle became the head JV coach at Mandarin High School. Two years later he served as the running backs coach at nearby Nease High School where he coached then 16 year old Tim Tebow. In 2004 Hartle rejoined the Florida football team full-time as the game analysis coordinator. In 2005, Hartle introduced Tebow to then head coach Urban Meyer and was an integral part of his recruiting process.

Activism
Hartle lost 3 relatives to the opioid epidemic in Florida and was a vocal supporter of the cannabis legalization movement as a safe, natural pain relieving alternate to pain pills. He was also a supporter of The Tim Tebow Foundation.

References

1979 births
Living people
21st-century American comedians
Comedians from Indiana